= Casinofloor =

Online casino website

- Type: Private
- Industry: Casino
- Founded: 2004
- Headquarters: Malta
- Key people: Jack Mizel, CEO

CasinoFloor.com is an online casino website. It offers traditional and new casino games on computers and mobile devices. Casinofloor utilizes HTML5 web-based technology for the site's graphics.

== History ==
CasinoFloor.com was registered in May 2004 (Registration Number: C44411) and obtained a license from the Lotteries & Gaming Authority of Malta (License no: LGA/CL2/497/2008) on 3rd Feb, 2009.

== Marketing ==
On 10 February 2015, CasinoFloor announced former England and Manchester United defender Rio Ferdinand as a brand ambassador, a partnership covered by trade press at the time. The endorsement drew criticism in some UK media and on social platforms for a perceived conflict with responsible-gambling messaging directed at young fans.

== Ownership and regulation ==
CasinoFloor.com has been reported as being operated on EveryMatrix's OddsMatrix platform via the Maltese entity OddsMatrix Ltd with operations and consumer-facing terms linked to Malta as the regulating jurisdiction.
